Harvey Brown may refer to:

 Harvey Brown (officer) (1795–1874), American military officer
 Harvey R. Brown (born 1950), British philosopher
 Harvey E. Brown Jr. (1836–1889), American military officer and army surgeon